Tara Moore and Conny Perrin were the defending champions, but Perrin chose not to participate. Moore partnered Emina Bektas, but lost to Samantha Murray and Bibiane Schoofs in the semifinals.

Mélodie Collard and Leylah Annie Fernandez won the title, defeating Murray and Schoofs in the final, 7–6(7–3), 6–2.

Seeds

Draw

Draw

References
Main Draw

Challenger Banque Nationale de Saguenay - Doubles
Challenger de Saguenay